Chumbivilcas is a province in the Andes in South Peru. The Inca called it "Chumpiwillka". The seat of the province is Santo Tomás. Officially Chumbivilcas was founded on June 21, 1825.

Geography 
Some of the most important rivers of the area are Velille River, Qañawimayu and Sinqa Wayq'u which are springs of the Apurímac River.

The Wansu mountain range traverses the province. Some of the highest peaks of the province are listed below:

Population 
According to the Peru 2005 Census 77,721 inhabitants live in an area of 5,371.08 km². There are about 77 rural communities. Chumbivilcas is looked upon as one of the poorest regions of the country. Half of the population is younger than 16 years. In the rural communities families with eight and more children are not unusual.

Ethnic groups 
The people in the province are mainly indigenous citizens of Quechua descent. Quechua is the language which the majority of the population (91.07%) learnt to speak in childhood, 8.62% of the residents started speaking in Spanish (2007 Peru Census).

Because of the migration of a high number of rural people to the towns the Spanish language (castellano) is getting more and more influence. School children are taught bilingually by law.

Political divisions
Chumbivilcas is one of 13 provinces of the Cusco Region. It is divided into eight districts:

 Santo Tomás
 Capacmarca
 Chamaca
 Colquemarca
 Livitaca
 Llusco
 Quiñota
 Velille

See also 
 Ccoyo
 Chukchu
 Khirkiqucha
 Tupay Tuqtu
 Urququcha
 Wamanmarka
 Warmiqucha

Graphics 
 The Provinces of Cusco Region
 The Districts

References

External links
 Chumbivilcas (Spanish)
 Infocusco: Chumbivilcas (Spanish)
 Satellite Photos: All Population Centers

Provinces of the Cusco Region